John-Erik Blomqvist (born 17 May 1945) is a retired Swedish pole vaulter who won the national title in 1967. He competed at the 1968 Summer Olympics and placed fifth-sixth at the European championships in 1969 and 1971.

References

1945 births
Living people
Athletes (track and field) at the 1968 Summer Olympics
Olympic athletes of Sweden
Swedish male pole vaulters
20th-century Swedish people